Brinkerhoff or Brinckerhoff is a surname. Notable people with the surname include:

Burt Brinckerhoff (born 1936), American actor, director, and producer
Corinne Brinkerhoff (born 1979), American television writer and producer
Elbert Adrain Brinckerhoff (1838–1913), first mayor of Englewood, New Jersey
Henry M. Brinckerhoff (1868–1949), American highway engineer
Henry R. Brinkerhoff (1787–1844), represented Ohio as a member of the U. S. House of Representatives in the 28th Congress
Jacob Brinkerhoff (1810–1880), American jurist, Congressman, and author of the Wilmot Proviso
John Brinkerhoff, associate director for national preparedness of the U. S. Federal Emergency Management Agency
Peter Brinckerhoff (fl. 1980–2009), American actor and director on television soap operas
Robert Moore Brinkerhoff (1880–1958), American political cartoonist, creator of comic strip Little Mary Mixup (1917-1957)
Roeliff Brinkerhoff (1828–1911), American Civil War officer, brigadier general, and founder of Ohio Historical Society